Atomic Energy Centre is the oldest nuclear research centre in Bangladesh and is located in Dhaka, Bangladesh. It falls within the campus of University of Dhaka and is under the management of Bangladesh Atomic Energy Commission.

History
Atomic Energy Centre was completed in December 1964 and was formally inaugurated on 27 April 1965 by Pakistan Atomic Energy Commission. The facility had a 5000 curie Cobalt-60 gamma radiation source, an IBM 1620 computer, and a Van de Graaff accelerator. On 16 December 1971 Bangladesh Liberation war ended and Bangladesh became an independent country. On 3 March 1972 a scientist was made an Officer on Special Duty in the Ministry of Education and Cultural Affairs in charge of atomic affairs. Through a presidential order on 27 February 1973 Bangladesh Atomic Energy Commission was formed and the centre was placed under it. The centre has developed Iratom-24 and Iratom-38, two high yielding rice variety and one high yield pulse called Hyprosola. The centre researched ways of preserving food through radiation and the sterilisation of medical equipment.

References

Research institutes in Bangladesh
Government agencies of Bangladesh
1964 establishments in Pakistan
Nuclear technology in Bangladesh
Organisations based in Dhaka